Bineswar Brahma Engineering College was established in 2008 by Assam Government at Kokrajhar district, Assam. In 2006 Assam Government announced that an engineering college would be set up at Kokrajhar. The college is situated at a village called Chandrapara, which is 5 km from Kokrajhar town. The engineering college is named after the prominent leader of Bodo community and former president of Bodo Sahitya Sabha Bineswar Brahma. The college is affiliated to Assam Science and Technology University, Guwahati, Assam and is accredited by the All India Council for Technical Education (AICTE). The institution is a TEQIP- 3 mapped institute. The institution is the headquarter of the Engineering Council of India (Northeast region)  and CIDC (Northeast region).

Location
Bineswar Brahma Engineering College is situated at Chandrapara, a village which is 5 km from Kokrajhar town.

Academics
The college offers 4-year Bachelor of Engineering courses.

Admissions
Students are taken in for the undergraduate courses through Combined Entrance Examination (CEE) conducted by Assam Science and Technology University.
For lateral entry into the undergraduate courses are done through the Joint Lateral Entrance Examination(JLEE) conducted by the Director of Technical Education, Assam.

Facilities

Computer Center
The Computer Center (CC) in BBEC which caters to the needs of academic departments and various sections of the institute. CC is facilitated with high speed NKN internet connectivity with separate sitting arrangement for Students & Staff.

Library
The College has a well maintained Library with adequate books & staff. There is also has excellent study arrangement for students and faculties.

Canteen
College canteen is available with well maintained.

Medical
The College has sufficient medical facility with professional team.

Bus
The College is providing sufficient bus services for the students & staff with the help of Bodoland Transport Services.

Sports
The college is providing sufficient assistance to boost-up students’ sports spirit. And also, providing adequate sports materials for the same.

Festival
There is an annual festival called Technisia which is held here. Mainly various competitions related to technology and culture take place in this festival. Apart from these various debates and robotic workshops are also held in this festival.

Training and Placement
Training and Placement cell- The training and placement cell of this college looks after the internship training and campus interviews of the students.

References

External links
 Official website

All India Council for Technical Education
2008 establishments in Assam
Educational institutions established in 2008
Engineering colleges in Assam
Universities and colleges in Assam
Education in Kokrajhar district